Grantham Farm is a suburb of Sydney, in the state of New South Wales, Australia. Grantham Farm is located in north-west Sydney in the local government area of Blacktown.

History
Grantham Farm was gazetted on 6 November 2020. It was previously a part of Riverstone.

The suburb is named after the Grantham Farm Estate, which was a subdivision of the original land grant of 'Riverstone'. The land grant was given to Lieutenant-Colonel Maurice Charles O'Connell by Governor Lachlan Macquarie in 1810. The estate contained a 6-bedroom cottage and other outbuildings as well as vineyards.

Demographics
According to the 2021 census of population, there were 3,669 people in Grantham Farm. 53.9% of people were born in Australia and 52.8% of people spoke only English at home. <!--The most common responses for religion in Grantham Farm were Catholic 25.8%, Hinduism 17.3% and No Religion 19.7%.

References

External links
Map of Grantham Farm (November 2020) – Blacktown City Council

Suburbs of Sydney
City of Blacktown